The Essential Poco is a compilation album of recordings by the band Poco released in 2005 as part of Sony BMG's Essential series.

Track listing
"Pickin' Up the Pieces" (Richie Furay) – 3:20
"You Better Think Twice" (Jim Messina) – 3:21
"Anyway Bye Bye" (Furay) – 7:01
"C'mon [Live]" (Furay) – 3:10
"Kind Woman [Live]" (Furay) – 6:07
"Bad Weather" (Paul Cotton) – 5:02
"Just For Me And You" (Furay) – 3:37
"A Good Feelin' To Know" (Furay) – 5:15
"Go And Say Goodbye" (Stephen Stills) – 2:46
"Here We Go Again" (Timothy B. Schmit) – 3:28
"High and Dry" (Rusty Young) – 4:49
"Crazy Love" (Young) – 2:55
"Heart Of The Night" (Cotton) – 4:49
"Shoot For The Moon" (Young) – 2:48
"Call It Love" (Ron Gilbeau, Billy Crain, Rick Lonow) – 4:17
"Nothin’ To Hide" (Richard Marx, Bruce Gaitsch) – 5:12
"When It All Began" (Steve Pasch, M. Krizan, Richie Furay, Scott Sellen) – 3:36

Personnel
Jim Messina - guitar, vocals
Richie Furay - guitar, 12-string guitar, vocals
Rusty Young - steel guitar, banjo, dobro, guitar, piano, vocals
George Grantham - drums, vocals
Randy Meisner - bass, guitar, vocals
Timothy B. Schmit - bass, vocals
Paul Cotton - guitar, vocals
Charlie Harrison - bass, vocals
Steve Chapman – drums
Kim Bullard – keyboards, vocals

References

Poco compilation albums
2005 greatest hits albums